Dinneen ( for men,  for women) is a surname of Irish origin. The family was famous for having supplied generations of court poets to their overlords in the ancient kingdom of Corcu Loígde.

List of people with the surname Dinneen
Bill Dinneen, baseball player
Dan Dinneen  (1870–1948), American businessman and politician
John Dinneen, politician
Joseph F. Dinneen, writer
Michael Dinneen, mathematician and computer scientist
Patrick S. Dinneen, lexicographer and historian

See also
Dannen
Dennen (disambiguation)
Dineen
Deneen